Ignazio Ciufolini (born 1951) is an Italian physicist active in the field of gravitational physics and general relativity.

Biography
Ignazio Ciufolini graduated magna cum laude in 1980 at Sapienza University of Rome, and received a PhD in Physics in 1984 at the University of Texas at Austin.

From 1982 to 1988 he worked at University of Texas at Austin as a teaching assistant, lecturer and research associate. He is now an Associate Professor of General Physics at University of Salento (Italy), tenured since 1999, and a member of Centro Fermi, Rome. He collaborated with John Archibald Wheeler in 1995 to write Gravitation and Inertia, for which they won the PROSE Award for the best professional and scholar book in physics and astronomy. He works mainly in the field of General Relativity and Gravitational Physics, proposing a method to measure the effects of gravitomagnetism using the data from the laser ranged satellites LAGEOS and LAGEOS-2. He was featured on the cover of the September 6, 2007 issue of Nature, dedicated to his review paper on Dragging of Inertial Frames and General Relativity. He is the Principal Investigator for the Italian Space Agency (ASI) of the Laser Relativity Satellite (LARES) mission, a space mission aimed to improve the accuracy of the measurement of frame-dragging.

In 2010 he won the Giuseppe Occhialini Medal and Prize, jointly awarded by the Italian Physical Society and the Institute of Physics.

He has been accused of publishing papers on the scientific pre-print archive arXiv.org under pseudonyms, such as G. Felici, and G. Forst which is a violation of the arXiv terms.

References

External links
 CV at LARES-mission.com

20th-century Italian physicists
Living people
1951 births
Sapienza University of Rome alumni
Academic staff of the University of Salento
University of Texas at Austin College of Natural Sciences alumni